Helen Hay Smith (29 August 1873 – 17 November 1918) was a notable New Zealand clothing manufacturer, retailer and businesswoman. She was born in McMaster's Flat, Central Otago, New Zealand, in 1873. She and her brother John co-founded the H & J Smith department store franchise.

References

1873 births
1918 deaths
New Zealand women in business
People from Otago
Deaths from Spanish flu